Gochihr (also spelled Gozihr) was a Persian dynast from the Bazrangid dynasty, who ruled Istakhr as a Parthian vassal in the early 3rd-century. He was killed in 205/6 by the Persian prince Pabag, who had his domains conquered.

Sources 

 

3rd-century Iranian people
History of Fars Province
Monarchs killed in action
3rd-century monarchs in the Middle East
206 deaths
2nd-century births
Vassal rulers of the Parthian Empire